
Year 399 BC was a year of the pre-Julian Roman calendar. At the time, it was known as the Year of the Tribunate of Augurinus, Longus, Priscus, Cicurinus, Rufus and Philo (or, less frequently, year 355 Ab urbe condita). The denomination 399 BC for this year has been used since the early medieval period, when the Anno Domini calendar era became the prevalent method in Europe for naming years.

Events 
 By place 
 Greece 
 February 15 – The Greek philosopher Socrates is sentenced to death by Athenian authorities, condemned for impiety and the corruption of youth. He refuses to flee into exile and dies by drinking hemlock.
 Sparta forces Elis to surrender in the spring.
 The Spartan admiral, Lysander, tries to effect a political revolution in Sparta by suggesting that the king should not automatically be given the leadership of the army. He also suggests that the position of king should be elective. However, he is unsuccessful in achieving these reforms, and earns the disfavour of King Agesilaus II of Sparta.
 King Archelaus I of Macedon is killed during a hunt, by one of the royal pages, his lover Craterus.

 Egypt 
 King Amyrtaeus of Egypt is defeated in battle by his successor, Nepherites I of Mendes, and executed at Memphis. King Nepherites I, or Nefaarud I, founds the Twenty-ninth dynasty of Egypt. He makes Mendes his capital.

Births

Deaths 
 King Amyrtaeus of Egypt
 King Archelaus I of Macedon
 Socrates, Greek philosopher (b. c. 470 BC)

References